The Holtzendorf Apartments, at 105 W. Pine St. in Fitzgerald, Georgia, was built in 1908.  It was listed on the National Register of Historic Places in 1988.

It is a two-and-a-half-story brick apartment building.  It has a two-story double porch in the middle of its main facade, with square columns; the upper porch has a wooden balustrade.  It has Craftsman details including "a multiple-gabled low-pitched roof, with projecting dormer windows and broad eaves, and a diamond-pattern window glazing."

A one-story masonry carport to the east of apartment building, is a second contributing building.  It is not enclosed; the roof is supported by decorative cast-iron columns.

References

American Craftsman architecture in Georgia (U.S. state)
National Register of Historic Places in Ben Hill County, Georgia
Residential buildings completed in 1909